Mousey (released as Cat and Mouse in theaters and on UK television) is a 1974 Canadian thriller action drama film directed by Daniel Petrie, and starring Kirk Douglas, Jean Seberg and John Vernon.

Although made for television, it was released theatrically outside of the U.S. In London, it was shown as part of a double feature with Craze.

Plot 
In Halifax, Novia Scotia, biology teacher George Anderson (Douglas) earns the nickname "Mousey" from his students when he is unable to dissect a frog. However, when he learns that the child that his pregnant wife (Seberg) is expecting is not his, he follows her to Montreal, where he plans to kill her and her lover.

Cast

Production 

Mousey was filmed on location in Montreal, Canada and at Pinewood Studios in England. Filming commenced in November 1973.

Reception 

The film received mixed reviews. Steven H. Scheuer was negative, saying that, "It's complicated and not very interesting;" and the Los Angeles Times wrote that "Mousey seems to have been doomed from the start." Leonard Maltin, however, reviewed it positively, calling it "tightly made" and praising Douglas as "wonderfully sinister," and Amis du film called it "a good 'suspense' film," although noting a lack of originality in its plot. Monthly Film Bulletin called it "a thriller with some pretensions to psychological depth."

Legacy 

Mousey has since been re-shown on television and released on VHS, resulting in blogs noting the film's rising cult status.

References 
Citations

Bibliography

External links 
 
 
 
 
 

Canadian action thriller films
1970s action thriller films
1970s thriller drama films
Canadian drama films
English-language Canadian films
Films directed by Daniel Petrie
Films produced by Beryl Vertue
Films produced by Aida Young
Films scored by Ron Grainer
Films shot in Montreal
Films shot in London
EMI
Alliance Atlantis films
ABC Motion Pictures films
Universal Pictures films
Warner Bros. films
1974 drama films
1974 films
1970s Canadian films